The 1979 British Formula Three season was the 29th season of the British Formula Three Championship.

Only Project Four Racing and Team Tiga appeared properly prepared for the 1979 season, with respective drivers Chico Serra and Andrea de Cesaris. It would be Serra’s consistency that saw him take the BARC/BRDC Vandervell British Formula 3 Championship after a number of avoidable accidents and mistakes from de Cesaris, dropped him from contention. The Kiwi teenage sensation, Mike Thackwell was also very consistent, winning four of the last eight races for the works March Racing team.

B.A.R.C./B.R.D.C. Vandervell British F3 Championship
Champion:  Chico Serra

Runner Up:  Andrea de Cesaris

Results

Table

Non-Championship Races

Results

References

Formula Three
British Formula Three Championship seasons
1979 in Formula Three